Alfred Kenneth Hamilton Jenkin  (29 October 1900 – 20 August 1980) was a British historian with a particular interest in Cornish mining, publishing The Cornish Miner, now a classic, in 1927.

Birth and education
He was born in Redruth on 29 October 1900, the son of Alfred Hamilton Jenkin, and his wife, Amy Louisa Keep. He attended University College, Oxford, where in 1919 he became a friend of the famous author, C.S. Lewis: both were members of the Martlets Literary Society. He graduated as M.A. and B.Litt. at the University of Oxford.

Cornish activities

Jenkin was a founder bard of the Gorseth Kernow in 1928, taking the bardic name Lef Stenoryon ('Voice of the Tinners'). He was involved in persuading Cornwall County Council to set up Cornwall Record Office in the 1950s, and served on its committee until his death. In 1959 he was elected President of the Federation of Old Cornwall Societies, a position he also held in 1960 and in 1962 he became its first life President.

He was elected President of the Royal Institution of Cornwall for the years 1958, 1959 and was vice-president in 1977.

Recognition as an historian
In 1954 he was elected a Fellow of the Society of Antiquaries and was awarded his honorary degree of Doctor of Letters by the University of Exeter in 1978.

Personal life
He married Luned Marion Jacobs (2nd daughter of W. W. Jacobs, the famous humourist) and had two daughters: Jennifer Hamilton Jenkin and Honor Bronwen Jenkin. The marriage ended in divorce and his second marriage was to Elizabeth Lenton.

Death

He died 20 August 1980 at Treliske Hospital, Truro

Publications
"Boulton and Watt in Cornwall" in Royal Cornwall Polytechnic Society Annual Report, 1926
 The Cornish Miner: an Account of his Life Above and Underground from Early Times. London: George Allen & Unwin, 1927: three editions, including 3rd edition, 1962 (reprinted by David & Charles, Newton Abbot, 1972 ; reprinted in facsimile with an introduction by John H. Trounson, Launceston: Westcountry, 2004 )
"The Nationalisation of West-Country Minerals". (New Fabian Research Bureau. Publications series; no. 3) 17 pages. [London, 1932]
 Cornish Seafarers: the Smuggling, Wrecking and Fishing Life of Cornwall. London: J. M. Dent, 1932
 Cornwall and Its People: being a new impression of the composite work .... London: J. M. Dent, 1945 (reprinted 1970 by David & Charles, Newton Abbot ) including:
"Cornish Seafarers", 1932
"Cornwall and the Cornish: the story, religion and folk-lore of ’The Western Land’", 1933
"Cornish homes and customs", 1934
Cornwall and the Cornish: the story, religion and folk-lore of ’The Western Land’, London: J. Dent, 1933
Cornish Homes and Customs. London: J. M. Dent, 1934
 The Story of Cornwall. London: Thomas Nelson, 1934 (reprinted by D. Bradford Barton, Truro, 1962)
 The Western Land. London: Great Western Railway, 1937
 News from Cornwall. London: Westaway Books, 1946
 News from Cornwall, edited, with a memoir of William Jenkin, by A. K. Hamilton Jenkin. 1951
 Mines and Miners of Cornwall in 16 volumes, vols. 1–14 originally published by the Truro Bookshop, 1961 onwards and reprinted by various organisations:
 Pt. I. Around St. Ives  
 Pt. II. St. Agnes, Perranporth  
 Pt. III. Around Redruth  
 Pt. IV. Penzance-Mount's Bay  
 Pt. V. Hayle, Gwinear and Gwithian  
 Pt. VI. Around Gwennap  
 Pt. VII. Perranporth-Newquay
 Pt. VIII. Truro to the clay district
 Pt. IX. Padstow, St Columb and Bodmin
 Pt. X. Camborne and Illogan
 Pt. XI. Marazion, St Hilary and Breage
 Pt. XII. Liskeard area
 Pt. XIII. The Lizard-Falmouth-Mevagissey
 Pt. XIV. St Austell to Saltash
 Pt. XV. Calstock, Callington and Launceston Penzance: Federation of Old Cornwall Societies, 1969 (reprinted Bracknell: Forge Books, 1976) 
 Pt. XVI. Wadebridge, Camelford and Bude Penzance: Federation of Old Cornwall Societies, 1970
 Index to Mines and Miners of Cornwall: Volumes 1–16. St. Austell: Federation of Old Cornwall Societies, 1978
 Mines of Devon. Newton Abbot: David & Charles, 1974
Volume 1: South Devon 
Volume 2: Mines of Devon, north and east of Dartmoor: Sydenham Damerel, Lydford, Wheal Betsy, Wheal Friendship, Okehampton, Sticklepath, Chagford, Buckfastleigh, Ashburton, Ilsington, Teign Valley, Newton St. Cyres, and Upton Pyne. (Reprinted by Devon Libraries 1981 )
Both volumes reprinted by Landmark, 2005 
 Wendron Tin (commissioned by Poldark Mine), 1978

References

 Obituary in Old Cornwall. Vol IX, No 4, Spring, 1981.
 ODNB Article by Justin Brooke, 'Jenkin, (Alfred) Kenneth Hamilton (1900–1980)’, Oxford Dictionary of National Biography, Oxford University Press, 2004 , accessed 26 March 2008.

External links
 The Cumberland River Lamp Post (C.S. Lewis appreciation website) accessed 26 March 2008.
 A list of personal names of miners and other people mentioned in the series "Mines and Miners of Cornwall", has been compiled by Michael Messenger, and can be found at http://www.twelveheads.com/mjm/mmcnames.htm

1900 births
1980 deaths
Alumni of University College, Oxford
Bards of Gorsedh Kernow
British antiquarians
Fellows of the Society of Antiquaries of London
People from Redruth
History of mining in the United Kingdom
Mining in Cornwall
Historians of Cornwall
Writers from Cornwall
20th-century English historians
20th-century antiquarians